Carry A. Nation House near Lancaster, Kentucky is listed on the National Register of Historic Places in Garrard County, Kentucky, United States.  It was built in 1846.

It was a home of Carrie Nation, and was a 10-room house then.

See also
Carrie Nation House (Kansas)

References

Houses on the National Register of Historic Places in Kentucky
Houses in Garrard County, Kentucky
Houses completed in 1846
National Register of Historic Places in Garrard County, Kentucky
1846 establishments in Kentucky
House (Kentucky)